The Cape Nome Roadhouse is the last remaining historical roadhouse on the Iditarod Trail.  Built in 1900 to accommodate travelers to the Nome area during the Nome Gold Rush, it was soon expanded.  It has a profile resembling that of a typical New England saltbox house, although its main entrance is on what would normally be considered the side of such a building.  Its oldest portion is a log structure, which was expanded with lumber wood framing, and the whole building is now covered with clapboard siding.  It is the only structure surviving from the route of a  delivery of diphtheria serum in 1925 achieved by a relay of dogsled teams.  The roadhouse declined with the advent of aviation to the area, and was used as an orphanage, a military communications facility during World War II, and saw used in the later 20th century as a retail establishment.

The roadhouse was listed on the National Register of Historic Places in 1976.

See also
 Cape Nome
 National Register of Historic Places listings in Nome Census Area, Alaska

References

External links

  Cape Nome Roadhouse/INHT Trail Inventory
 Cape Nome Roadhouse – Statement of Significance
 Cape Nome Roadhouse
 Historic American Buildings Survey (HABS) No. AK-5-M, "Iditarod Trail Shelter Cabins, Cape Nome Roadhouse"

1900 establishments in Alaska
Buildings and structures completed in 1900
Commercial buildings on the National Register of Historic Places in Alaska
Historic American Buildings Survey in Alaska
Buildings and structures on the National Register of Historic Places in Nome Census Area, Alaska
Retail buildings in Alaska